Dinosaur Planet Survivors or Survivors: Dinosaur Planet II is a 1984 science fiction novel by American writer Anne McCaffrey.
It is the sequel to Dinosaur Planet (1978) and thus the second book in the Ireta series.

In 1985 the first two books were issued in one omnibus edition, The Ireta Adventure. McCaffrey and co-authors continued the series in 1990 and 1991 with three books sometimes called the Planet Pirates trilogy or series.

Summary

Dinosaur Planet featured the survey of planet Ireta for its mineral wealth. Several mysteries unfolded whose resolution was interrupted by a Heavyworlder mutiny.

After 43 years, survivors of the mutiny are wakened from cold sleep. Their emergency message has been decoded by a Thek who asks questions but not about the mutiny. They tell him about a buried beacon they found, and he immediately leaves without helping them. Forced to survive on their own, they discover that the mutineers have built a settlement and landing grid that could only be used to colonize a planet—in this case, illegally. Several Thek arrive and seize control for their own reasons.

Reception
Dave Langford reviewed The Survivors: Dinosaur Planet II for White Dwarf #62, and stated that "The problem: this is 'straight' SF adventure and McCaffrey never seems interested in it, as she is in her romantic SF/fantasies with their dragons and singers. The writing's slipshod and the science dodgy."

References

External links

1984 American novels
1984 science fiction novels
Novels by Anne McCaffrey
Novels about dinosaurs
Novels set on fictional planets
Del Rey books
Orbit Books books